Woodgrange Baptist Church is a Baptist church on the Romford Road in Forest Gate, east London. It was built in 1882, with a hall added in 1899. It was damaged during the London Blitz but was repaired.

References

External links

Forest Gate
Stratford, London
Baptist churches in the London Borough of Newham
1882 establishments in England
19th-century Baptist churches